Dioptis paracyma is a moth of the family Notodontidae first described by Louis Beethoven Prout in 1918. It is found in Suriname, Guyana and French Guiana.

References

Moths described in 1918
Notodontidae of South America